The Great Birmingham Run is an annual half marathon road running event held in Birmingham, UK in October. Formerly known as the Birmingham Half Marathon, from 2011 it became part of the Great Run series of road races.

Established in 2008, it incorporated the 2009 IAAF World Half Marathon Championships. The 2009 event was televised live on Sky Sports and between 2011 and 2016 the race was televised live in the United Kingdom by Channel 5.

In 2019, the race distance was reduced to 11.07 miles due to a security alert close to Cannon Hill Park.

The 2020 edition of the race was cancelled due to the COVID-19 virus.

Winners 
Key:

References

External links 
Great Birmingham Run

Video highlights from FilmNova via BBC Sport

2016 race highlights
2015 race highlights
2014 race highlights
2013 race highlights
2012 race highlights

Results from Power of 10
 2019
 2018,
 2017,
 2016,
 2015, 2014, 2013, 2012, 2011, 2010, 2009, 2008

Half marathons in the United Kingdom
Sport in Birmingham, West Midlands
Athletics competitions in England
Recurring sporting events established in 2008
2008 establishments in England
Annual sporting events in the United Kingdom
Annual events in England
Sports competitions in Birmingham, West Midlands